Elberton is the largest city in Elbert County, Georgia, United States. The population was 4,653 at the 2010 census. The city is the county seat of Elbert County.

History
Settled in the 1780s, Elbert was designated seat of the newly formed Elbert County in 1790. It was incorporated as a town in 1803 and as a city in 1896. Like Elbert County, Elberton is named for Samuel Elbert.

Elberton is known as the "Granite Capital of the World".

Geography
Elberton is located near the center of Elbert County at  (34.109628, -82.865669). State Routes 17 and 72 pass east–west through the center of town as College Avenue, while 77 crosses north–south on Oliver Street. GA 17 leads northwest  to Royston and southeast  to Washington, GA 72 leads east  to the South Carolina border at Richard B. Russell Lake on the Savannah River and west  to Athens, and GA 77 leads north  to Hartwell and southwest  to Lexington.

Demographics

2020 census

As of the 2020 United States Census, there were 4,640 people, 1,754 households, and 997 families residing in the city.

2000 census
As of the census of 2000, there were 4,743 people, 1,985 households, and 1,274 families residing in the city. The population density was 1,183.4 people per square mile (456.7 per km2). There were 2,265 housing units at an average density of 565.1 per square mile (218.1 per km2). The racial makeup of the city was 59.33% White, 37.99% African American, 0.19% Native American, 0.61% Asian, 1.33% from other races, and 0.55% from two or more races. Hispanic or Latino people of any race were 2.21% of the population.

There were 1,985 households, out of which 29.1% had children under the age of 18 living with them, 37.9% were married couples living together, 21.8% had a female householder with no husband present, and 35.8% were non-families. 32.9% of all households were made up of individuals, and 18.0% had someone living alone who was 65 years of age or older. The average household size was 2.35 and the average family size was 2.96.

In the city, the population was spread out, with 26.5% under the age of 18, 8.7% from 18 to 24, 25.7% from 25 to 44, 20.3% from 45 to 64, and 18.7% who were 65 years of age or older. The median age was 37 years. For every 100 females, there were 82.6 males. For every 100 females age 18 and over, there were 76.4 males.

The median income for a household in the city was $23,246, and the median income for a family was $31,154. Males had a median income of $29,277 versus $19,470 for females. The per capita income for the city was $15,486. About 21.3% of families and 24.5% of the population were below the poverty line, including 34.3% of those under age 18 and 22.0% of those age 65 or over.

Government
Elberton operates under a council-manager form of government. In this style of government, the city manager is responsible for the day-to-day operations of the city, the five-person elected council serves as a board of directors, and the mayor performs more ceremonial duties and presides over council meetings, although Elberton mayors have traditionally taken a more active role in running the city.

The City of Elberton operates Elberton Utilities, a comprehensive utility system which includes electric, gas, water, sewer, cable television, and internet services; Elberton Public Works, which provides solid waste and street cleaning services and operates the city's cemeteries; Main Street Elberton, which promotes development in the downtown area; and the Elbert Theatre, which reopened in 2001 after extensive renovations and now hosts numerous productions throughout the year. The city is the primary benefactor of the Development Authority of Elberton, Elbert County, and Bowman.

For over twenty years, Elberton has been the sister city of Mure, Kagawa, Japan. Students have the opportunity each year to participate in an exchange program sponsored by the two cities.

Elberton was named a Georgia City of Excellence by the Georgia Municipal Association in 2002. It received commendation as a Trendsetter by Georgia Trend Magazine in 2005. The city was selected to host the Georgia Literary Festival in 2005 due to the area's contributions to literature.

Economy

Granite
Elberton claims the title "Granite Capital of the World", although there are no statistics that qualify such a claim. The city's post-Civil War history has largely revolved around the industry, following the opening of the first commercial quarry and manufacturing plant by Dr. Nathaniel Long in 1889. As the industry grew in the early 1900s, so did Elberton's importance on the passenger and freight railroad lines, bringing many travelers and businessmen to the city and leading to its heyday.

Several granite monuments, including the now-destructed Georgia Guidestones, are located in or near Elberton.

Elberton's Granite Bowl seats 20,000 and formerly featured a retired Sanford Stadium (University of Georgia) scoreboard.

The city is home to the Elberton Granite Museum and Exhibit, with a notable exhibit being "Dutchy", a Confederate monument made of granite that was removed from the town square due to its appearance.

Southeastern Power
Since 1950, Elberton has served as the headquarters of the Southeastern Power Administration, a division of the United States Department of Energy. The authority markets power generated by the United States Army Corps of Engineers across the southern United States. The authority recently moved from its downtown headquarters in the former Samuel Elbert Hotel to a new building on Athens Tech Drive on the western end of the city.

Nature's Harmony Farm
Founded in 2008, Nature's Harmony Farm mainly produces poultry, eggs, meats, and farmstead cheese. The farm has received local, national, and international praise, receiving the 2012 gold medal in the Jersey World Cheese Championships in England and the 2014 Grand Champion status in the Flavor of Georgia Competition.

Education

Elbert County School District 
The city is served by the Elbert County School District. One learning center, one primary school, one elementary school, one middle school, and one high school are located within the city. The district has 194 full-time teachers and over 3,079 students. The school system is one of the county's largest employers.

Private education
Elberton Christian School was located on Rhodes Drive in the city, but has closed.

Colleges and universities
Athens Technical College operates a full satellite campus on the western end of the city, near the elementary school, middle school, and high school.

Media
Elberton is currently served by one newspaper, The Elberton Star, though several others (including the Elbert County Examiner and the Elbert Beacon, both of which merged with the Star) have covered the city over the years.  The Star has been published since 1887.

The Anderson (S.C.) Independent-Mail publishes a daily Northeast Georgia edition which covers the Elberton area.

The city is served by four local radio stations. WSGC-AM 1400, which plays an oldies format, is one of Georgia's oldest, having been on the air since 1947. WSGC-FM 92.1 and WXKT-FM 100.1 play country music while WLVX-FM 105.1 specializes in R&B.

Elberton is in the Greenville-Spartanburg-Asheville television market, though local cable and satellite providers also carry stations from the Atlanta market.

Transportation infrastructure

Highways

Georgia State Routes 17, 72, 77 and 77 Connector pass through the city. Heard, Oliver, Church, and McIntosh streets are the primary thoroughfares downtown while College Avenue and Elbert Street bypass the downtown area and serve as the major routes through the city.

State Route 72 connects Elberton with Athens to the west and Greenwood, South Carolina, to the east, while State Route 77 connects to Lexington and Hartwell. State Route 17 stretches from the North Georgia mountains to the coast at Savannah. State Route 368 begins just north of the city and links Elberton to Anderson, South Carolina.

Plans for the proposed Interstate 3 have the highway passing through Elberton.

Airports

Elberton and Elbert County are served locally by the Elbert County-Patz Field Airport, located just east of the city on State Route 72.

Regional air transportation is available in the nearby cities of Athens, Georgia, and Anderson, South Carolina.

Railroad

For many years, Elberton was an important passenger and freight stop on the main line of the Seaboard Air Line Railroad. The line is now operated by CSX Transportation and remains in use for freight transportation. A spur line connects Elberton to a main line of the Norfolk Southern Railway (formerly Southern Railway).

Healthcare
Elbert Memorial Hospital, located at the corner of Laurel and Chestnut streets, has provided medical care to the Elberton region since 1950. Then-Governor Herman Talmadge presided over the dedication of the facility, calling it "one of the nation's finest." The hospital is accredited by the Joint Commission.

Today, Elbert Memorial is a 25-bed acute care critical access hospital with emergency, surgical, and rehabilitation facilities, as well as a wellness center and cafeteria. The hospital is currently researching potential expansion opportunities, either through an extensive reworking of the current facility or by moving to a new location.

Other nearby hospitals include Athens Regional Medical Center and St. Mary's Hospital in Athens and Anderson Area Medical Center (AnMed) in Anderson, South Carolina.

Notable people

 Brent Adams, NFL Offensive Lineman for Atlanta Falcons and Los Angeles Rams
 Amos T. Akerman, U.S. Attorney General under Ulysses S. Grant, fought railroad corruption and the Ku Klux Klan
 William Wyatt Bibb, appointed first governor of Alabama, U.S. senator, 1813–1816
 Paul Brown, 14-term U.S. congressman, 1933–1961
 Clark Gaines, NFL running back for New York Jets
 George Rockingham Gilmer, two-term governor of Georgia, U.S. congressman
 Derek Harper, University of Illinois and 16-year NBA point guard
 Corra May Harris, early 20th century author, lived at Farm Hill
 Nancy Hart, Revolutionary War heroine
 Stephen Heard, governor of Georgia, 1780–1781
 William H. Heard, former slave, clergyman and U.S. ambassador to Liberia
 Joseph Rucker Lamar, former United States Supreme Court justice
 Meriwether Lewis, of the Lewis and Clark Expedition, lived in Elbert County
 Juanita Marsh, third female judge in Georgia, 2020 Georgia Women of Achievement inductee
 Arnall Patz, discovered cause of blindness in premature infants and helped develop laser treatment of diabetic retinopathy
 Charles Tait, U.S. senator, 1809–1819
 Otha Thornton, White House Communications Agency J1 director and presidential communications officer (Bush and Obama administrations), 2013 Ebony Power 100, 53rd National Parent Teacher Association president and chairman of the board, and 2018 state Democratic nominee for state school superintendent
 Wiley Thompson, U.S. congressman and Indian agent, oversaw removal of Seminoles from Florida (Second Seminole War)
 Daniel Tucker, preacher, possible subject of "Old Dan Tucker" song
 Chester Willis, former NFL halfback
Chester Webb, Georgia Sports Hall of Fame

Sister cities
Elberton has a sister city, as designated by Sister Cities International, Inc. (SCI):
 Mure, Japan (1983)

The program sends and receives high school students and chaperones each year. They stay in Elbert County with host families for two weeks. Many long-term relationships have formed between the two cities. The thriving program celebrated its 35th year in 2017.

See also
Georgia–Carolina Memorial Bridge

References

External links
 
 City of Elberton official website
 Elberton at City-Data.com
 New Georgia Encyclopedia: Granite
 Elbert Theatre
 Mainstreet Elberton
 Elberton Granite Association

Cities in Georgia (U.S. state)
Cities in Elbert County, Georgia
County seats in Georgia (U.S. state)